The shining drongo (Dicrurus atripennis) is a species of bird in the family Dicruridae.
It is found in Cameroon, Central African Republic, Republic of the Congo, Democratic Republic of the Congo, Ivory Coast, Equatorial Guinea, Gabon, Ghana, Guinea, Liberia, Nigeria, Sierra Leone, and Togo.
Its natural habitat is subtropical or tropical moist lowland forests.

References

shining drongo
Birds of Central Africa
Birds of West Africa
shining drongo
Taxonomy articles created by Polbot